GIDS or Gids may refer to:

 De Gids, Dutch literary periodical 
 Global Industrial Defence Solutions, a Pakistani arms company 
 Graduate Institute of Development Studies, educational institute in Switzerland 
 NHS Gender Identity Development Service, a UK clinic for children with gender identity issues
 Graded Intergenerational Disruption Scale, used for measuring language vitality

See also
 GID (disambiguation)